Entertainment Konek (lit. Entertainment Connect) is a Philippine showbiz-oriented talk show aired on ABS-CBN. which as aired from February 5, 2005 to 2006, replacing EK Channel and was replaced by Entertainment Live.

Hosts
Ai-Ai delas Alas
Angelika dela Cruz
Toni Gonzaga
Ogie Diaz
Dominic Ochoa
Derek Ramsay
MJ Felipe
Direk Jose Javier Reyes
Ricci Chan
Stephanie Camacho
Boobita Rose
Paolo Buttones

See also
 List of programs broadcast by ABS-CBN
List of Philippine television shows
Entertainment Konek at Telebisyon.net

Philippine television talk shows
ABS-CBN original programming
2005 Philippine television series debuts
2006 Philippine television series endings
Entertainment news shows in the Philippines
Filipino-language television shows